Mincho Jordanov  is a Macedonian businessman.

Career
He is vice-president of the Economic Chamber of Macedonia.

Companies
Makstil AD Skopje (Steel factory) 
Remedika (Hospital) 
Nova Makedonija (Newspaper) 
Stobi (Winery) 
AD Beton (Construction)

Sponsorship
RK Metalurg (General sponsor'')

References

1944 births
People from Štip
Living people
Macedonian businesspeople
Macedonian politicians
Deputy Prime Ministers of North Macedonia